Wenchi Sporting Club formerly known as Unity Sporting Club is Ghanaian football club based in Wenchi, Brong-Ahafo. They are competing in the Brong Ahafo Division Two Zone 9. In July 2013 the club executives vote to change the name to Wenchi Sporting Club, a move which was aim at getting the people to Wenchi to have a sense of belonging to the club.

The club was founded in 2007 by the club's president Mr. Ernest Anokye-Gyan with support from Unity Community & Sport Association and Unity Football Club, of Reading in Berkshire, England to promote safe ground for young athletes to develop their football skill. The club also operate a sports academy which currently has 150 youngsters between ages of 10 – 21 years, focusing on the education and development of young athletes.

Unity Sporting Club uses football as a tool to engage a large pool of street children on a regular basis who traditionally have little access to sporting activities. The academy then aims to develop children's ability to be coached, both on and off the football pitch, with the aim of empowering them through a programme of non-formal education which is complemented by a fun and goal oriented rewards.

In other to keep the current players active the club has registered to play in Ghana Division Two League. This will also provide experience for the young players the Unity Academy. The club played in the Division Two League ”Third tier of Ghana Football Leagues” for the Season 2010/2011. This was a big step, and also opened way for the youth (academy) players to break into professional football through their own club (USC). This in no doubt increased and promoted healthy competition in the Ghana National League.

The Academy

Unity Academy is a Centre of Sporting Excellence run by Unity Sporting Club in association with UCSEF. The academy has a computer centre powered by Enterprise FI Solution. Aimed at disadvantaged children and young people, particularly orphans and victims of HIV/AIDS. The centre is based in Wenchi in the Brong Ahafo, a deprived area of Brong Ahafo region, Ghana. 150 boys aged 3–21 years, are currently enrolled.
The academy coaches provide free training session at a local girls school, this is the only way we can currently include girls in the project as very few girls have shown interest.

The academy offers full scholarships to those at risk of poverty and hardship.

UNITY ACADEMY is pioneering in its approach to pastoral care through sport, working collectively with local and international organisations to attain the overall objective of better welfare for local children. The academy is in partnership with local nursery, primary and secondary schools such as St. Augustine Catholic School and Koase Secondary School. The academy is in partnership with local businesses to apprenticeship for those who are not academically talented to learn trade which will better their survival chance in their communities.

Current squad

Staff
 Chairman:   Moses Yirenkyi Otchere
 Vice Chairman:  Francis Kyei Appiah
 President:  Ernest Anokye
 Director of Football:  Kwaku Nimako
 Finance Director:  Julius Atobrah Boateng
 Communications Director: 
 Chief Executive Officer:  Joseph Manu
 Club Secretary:  Stephen Ahenakwa
 Head Coach:  Kwabena George

Awards

Internal Awards

Unity Cup Competition

2009 Competition (September 2009)
 Under 12 Winners: Ajax Academy
 Under 12 Runners Up: Unity SC U12
 Under 14 Winners: Ajax Academy
 Under 14 Runners Up: Unity SC U14

References

External links 
 Ghana Leagues

Football clubs in Ghana
Association football clubs established in 2007
2007 establishments in Ghana
Brong-Ahafo Region